Imdad Hossain (c. 1926November 13, 2011) was a Bangladeshi artist and language movement activist. He was awarded Ekushey Padak in 2010 by the Government of Bangladesh.

Education and career
Hossain graduated from Dacca Art College (later Faculty of Fine Arts, University of Dhaka). He co-founded "Agrani Shilpa Shongo" in 1952.

Hossain designed sets for Bangladesh Television as a chief designer. He was also the chief designer of Bangladesh Small and Cottage Industry Corporation.

Awards
 Ekushey Padak (2010)
 Bangla Academy Fellowship (2009)

References

1920s births
2011 deaths
Recipients of the Ekushey Padak
Bengali language movement activists
Bangladeshi artists
University of Dhaka Faculty of Fine Arts alumni
Honorary Fellows of Bangla Academy